Bolognese (native name  ) is a dialect of Emilian spoken in the most part in the city of Bologna and its hinterland (except east of the Sillaro stream), but also in the district of Castelfranco Emilia in the Province of Modena, and in the towns of Sambuca Pistoiese (Tuscany), Cento, Sant'Agostino, and Poggio Renatico (Province of Ferrara).

Terminology

Although the term dialect is commonly used in reference to all minority languages native to Italy, most of them are not mutually intelligible with Italian. Bolognese is no exception and so is an Emilian dialect, not an Italian one.

Classification

Bolognese is a dialect of Emilian, one of the Gallo-Italic languages of the Romance family. It shares many common features with other Gallo-Italic languages such as Piedmontese, Lombard, Venetian, Romagnol and Ligurian, and it is closer to them than to Italian.

History
 
"… I say, then, that perhaps those are not wrong who claim that the Bolognese speak a more beautiful language than most, especially since they take many features of their own speech from that of the people who live around them, in Imola, Ferrara and Modena I believe that everybody does this with respect to his own neighbours.... So the above-mentioned citizens of Bologna take a soft, yielding quality from those of Imola, and from the people of Ferrara and Modena, on the other hand, a certain abruptness which is more typical of the Lombards.... If, then, the Bolognese take from all sides, as I have said, it seems reasonable to suggest that their language, tempered by the combination of opposites mentioned above, should achieve a praiseworthy degree of elegance; and this, in my opinion, is beyond doubt true." (Dante Alighieri, De Vulgari Eloquentia - Liber I, xv, 2-5)

Middle Ages
Bolognese evolved a group of Gallo-Romance languages sharing features with neighbouring northern Italian languages. It developed more distinctly into the Middle Ages as a dialect of the Emilian language. During the High Middle Ages, a number of troubadours composing lyrical poetry were active in Bologna, especially during the 13th century. That served to raise cultural awareness to the possibility of composing songs, poems and other works in vernacular languages. One of the first references to Bolognese as a distinct language was made by Dante Alighieri, in his De Vulgari Eloquentia, written in the beginning of the 14th century.

Modern
During the boom of interest in linguistic diversity during the 19th century, a number of efforts were made to create vocabularies, grammars, and collections of axioms, folk tales, and literature. The first dictionary was compiled in 1901 by Gaspare Ungarelli, who also attempted to create a writing system using the Italian alphabet. A period of stigmatisation followed in the 20th century, where children were punished for speaking the dialect in school, as it was considered to be a sign of poor education and etiquette.

In 1964, Alberto Menarini proposed an alphabet with many of the same letters still used.

Phonology
Here are some prominent features of Bolognese phonology:
 phonemic distinction between short vowels and corresponding long vowels/diphthongs
 nucleus vowel and coda consonant length having an inverse relationship
 realisation of labio-alveolar consonants
 syncopation resulting in complex consonant clusters
 frequent slacking of word-final voiceless obstruents
 more exaggerated intonation than in Italian

The phonemes of Bolognese are realized phonetically very differently depending on the area in or around Bologna. Much free variation occurs in words from complex phonological processes.

Consonants
Bolognese has 22 consonant phonemes:

Morphosyntax

Inflection
Bolognese distinguishes two genders, masculine and feminine, and two numbers, single and plural. In most nouns, the suffix -a is added to the masculine word to indicate femininity: defizänt, defizänta; påndg, påndga.

The formation of Bolognese plurals is complicated. Unlike Italian, inflection usually doesn't happen through addition of suffixes, but rather through apophony. For example:

 å → ó:  "blond,"  "blonds"
 ô → û:  "knee,"   "knees"

There are some exceptions to this rule, such as  "normal," which is unchanged when made plural, and some others such as  "godfather" are unchanged when made plural because words are not truncated, that is, with a tonic accent that does not fall on è or ô.

Masculine words that end in a consonant are unchanged when pluralised, so the number can only be identified through the preceding article:  "the branch,"  "the branches."  In addition to this, pluralised feminine words that are not constructed from a masculine word do not have an -a:  "the wheel,"  "the wheels." The plurals of feminine words constructed from masculine words are formed by using an  instead of an :  "blonde,"  "blondes;"  "aunt,"  "aunts."

References

Emilia (region of Italy)
Emilian-Romagnol language